Fix the Court is an advocacy group that seeks reform of the U.S. federal court system. The group lobbies for term limits for members of the U.S. Supreme Court, for streaming live audio and video of the court's oral arguments, and for publicizing potential conflicts of interest among justices. Fix the Court submitted multiple Freedom of Information Act requests related to the Supreme Court nominations of Neil Gorsuch and Brett Kavanaugh, as well as for all 25 people that former President Donald Trump put on his shortlist of potential Supreme Court nominees.

When Brett Kavanaugh was nominated to the U.S. Supreme Court, Fix the Court bought several Internet domain names related to Kavanaugh and redirected them to websites including End Rape On Campus, the National Sexual Violence Resource Center, and the Rape, Abuse & Incest National Network. Fix the Court's executive director, Gabe Roth, said he purchased and redirected the websites because he believed the sexual assault allegations made by Christine Blasey Ford against Brett Kavanaugh and by Anita Hill against Clarence Thomas.

Fix the Court was funded by the New Venture Fund, but since Feb. 2021 has been registered as an independent 501(c)(3) nonprofit.

References

External links
 

Political organizations based in the United States